Indigofera cassioides, the cassia indigo, is a species of flowering plant in the family Fabaceae. It is native to the Indian Subcontinent, Southeast Asia, southeast and south-central China, and Taiwan, and has been introduced to Sri Lanka and Kenya. Local artisans use its leaves to produce a blue dye.

References

cassioides
Flora of the Indian subcontinent
Flora of Indo-China
Flora of South-Central China
Flora of Southeast China
Flora of Taiwan
Plants described in 1825